Vinjamuri Anasuya Devi (May 12, 1920 – March 23, 2019) was a Telugu singer, harmonium player, music composer and author. Her forte was folk music and songs.

Early life and background
She was the daughter of Vinjamuri Venkata Lakshmi Narasimha Rao, who was an Indian stage actor, Telugu-Sanskrit pandit and author. Vinjamuri Seetha Devi, also a Telugu singer, was her sister.
She had given music concerts in the presence of Mahatma Gandhi, Jawaharlal Nehru, Sarvepalli Radhakrishnan and Subash Chandra Bose during the freedom struggle.

Her two books 'Bava Geetalu' and 'Compilation of Folk Songs' were released last year in Chennai. She was also honoured with Doctorate degree by Andhra University in the year 1977. She was also conferred with a lifetime achievement award from America and Queen of Folk award from Paris.

References

External links

https://www.madhuravani.com/anasuya మధురవాణి అంతర్జాల పత్రిక ప్రత్యేకం. madhuravani.com
https://www.madhuravani.com/blank-41 మధురవాణి అంతర్జాల పత్రిక ప్రత్యేకం. madhuravani.com
https://www.youtube.com/watch?v=ls9FXBHuX-s&t=677s Vinjamuri Anasuya Devi folk songs - original tracks

Telugu people
Indian women musicologists
Singers from Andhra Pradesh
Indian women folk singers
Indian folk singers
1920 births
2019 deaths